Lisa Witter (born July 5, 1973) is an American entrepreneur, consultant, speaker, and author. She is a co-author of The She Spot: Why Women are the Market for Changing the World and How to Reach Them (Berrett-Koehler, 2008). She has been Chief Strategy Officer and Chief Operating Officer of Fenton Communications, a public interest communications firm. She is currently Executive Chairman of the policy platform Apolitical. Lisa Witter is also the Co-Founder of the Institute for Democratic Future, Emerge, and the Apolitical Academy. She serves on the board of Hoc Rosten, Stonyfield Farms, is an advisor to Care.com as well as Co-Chairs the Global Future Council on Agile Government for the World Economic Forum. She regularly contributes pieces on politics, communications, policy and social change.

Career
Witter is the partner and Chief Change Officer of Fenton. She leads the firms work in innovation, global affairs and women.  She focuses on women's issues, communications, philanthropy, social change and politics. She has worked on or volunteered for numerous political campaigns and is focused on elected Democratic women. She served as legislative aide for Seattle City Council Member Peter Steinbreuck.

She is an emeritus member of the board of directors for Climate Counts, the national advisory board for MomsRising.org, the Op-Ed Project, Vittana.org and the communications advisory council for Women for Women International.

Together with Robyn Scott she co-founded Apolitical, a global platform for policymakers that specialises in government innovation.

Writing
With Lisa Chen, Witter wrote the 2008 book The She Spot: Why Women are the Market for Changing the World and How to Reach Them, which offers social change organizations key recommendations for leveraging the power of women for positive change through fundraising, advocacy and the ballot box. It garnered positive reviews from Publishers Weekly, Ode Magazine, the Chronicle of Philanthropy, and on Salon.com, BlogHer, and Feministing.

Witter appears regularly on television and radio as a political analyst and social commentator. She has been featured on CBS, MSNBC, Fox, and on NPR.

In 2004 she was a contestant on the Showtime reality show American Candidate, hosted by Montel Williams; she came in third place.

Awards
In 2010, Witter was named one of 197 Young Global Leaders by the World Economic Forum.

References

External links
 http://www.shesource.org
 http://www.vittana.org

Living people
People from Everett, Washington
University of California, Santa Cruz alumni
University of Padua alumni
University of Washington alumni
American emigrants to Germany
1973 births